The Caminhos Ecológicos da Boa Esperança Environmental Protection Area is an environmental protection area in the state of Bahia, Brazil.

Location

The Caminhos Ecológicos da Boa Esperança Environmental Protection Area (APA) covers parts of the municipalities of Ubaíra, Jiquiriçá, Teolândia, Wenceslau Guimarães, Nilo Peçanha, Taperoá, Cairu and Valença.
It covers an area to the south of Salvador along the Atlantic Coast, extending inland and including the Wenceslau Guimarães Ecological Station.
It adjoins the Baía de Camamu Environmental Protection Area to the south.

Environment

The APA is in the Atlantic Forest biome.
Vegetation includes restinga and mangroves along the coast and rainforest in the interior, rising to montane forest.
Fauna includes a wide range of mammals, birds, reptiles and so on, including endangered species such as the southern tamandua (Tamandua tetradactyla), sloth, coati and black-tufted marmoset (Callithrix penicillata).
The main threats are deforestation, poaching and squatting in the area of permanent preservation.

History

The Caminhos Ecológicos da Boa Esperança Environmental Protection Area was created by state governor decree 8.552 of 5 June 2003.
It was to be administered by the Superintendency for Forest Development and Conservation Units (SFC).
The purpose was to maintain the environmental quality of the territory it covered and to act as a buffer zone for the Wenceslau Guimarães Ecological Station.
It became part of the Central Atlantic Forest Ecological Corridor, created in 2002.

Notes

Sources

Environmental protection areas of Brazil
Protected areas of Bahia
2003 establishments in Brazil